USS John Paul Jones refers to two destroyers of the United States Navy, named after John Paul Jones:
 , a Forrest Sherman-class destroyer, commissioned in 1956, redesignated as DDG-32 in 1967, and decommissioned in 1982
 , an Arleigh Burke-class guided missile destroyer, commissioned in 1993, and in active service as of 2020

See also
 , three earlier United States Navy warships named after John Paul Jones.

Fiction
 USS John Paul Jones II, in the 1943 movie Destroyer, a World War II destroyer, the namesake of an earlier ship sunk in action by the Japanese

United States Navy ship names